Aeropsis rostrata is a species of sea urchin of the family Aeropsidae. Their armour is covered with spines. It is placed in the genus Aeropsis and lives in the sea. Aeropsis rostrata was first scientifically described in 1877 by Thomson.

References 

Spatangoida
Animals described in 1877